Furr Farm  is a historic home and farm located at Aldie, Loudoun County, Virginia. The house is a two-story, five bay, frame structure with a side gable roof and exterior end chimneys.  The property includes two contributing frame barns.

It was listed on the National Register of Historic Places in 2012.

References

Houses on the National Register of Historic Places in Virginia
Farms on the National Register of Historic Places in Virginia
National Register of Historic Places in Loudoun County, Virginia
Houses in Loudoun County, Virginia